90 day or 90 days may refer to:

Television 
 90 Days, Time to Love
 90 Day Fiancé

Film 
 90 Days
 90 Days (film)
 90 Day Wondering
 Mission 90 Days

Music 
 "90 Days" (Pink song)
 90 Day Men